Melissa Ann Benn (born 1957) is a British journalist and writer. She is the daughter of Tony Benn and Caroline Benn.

Biography
Benn was born in Hammersmith, London. She has three brothers, including Hilary Benn and Stephen Benn, 3rd Viscount Stansgate. She attended Fox Primary School and Holland Park School and graduated with a first in History from the London School of Economics. Benn spent several years working at the National Council for Civil Liberties, as an assistant to Patricia Hewitt, later Secretary of State for Health in Tony Blair's government, and then as a researcher at the Open University, under Professor Stuart Hall, working on deaths in custody.

Benn then worked as a journalist for City Limits magazine. Subsequently, she has written for other publications, including The Guardian, The London Review of Books and Marxism Today.

Her first novel, Public Lives, published in 1995, was described by writer Margaret Forster as "remarkably sophisticated for a first". In 1998 Jonathan Cape published Benn's Madonna and Child: towards a modern politics of motherhood which caused some controversy. The reviewers for The Guardian and The Observer criticised the book, while the Literary Review called it "a reflective, rich and rewarding investigation into the ...conditions of mothers' lives".  The Guardian featured Benn as one of a number of Britain's leading feminist writers at the time.

Benn co-edited, with Clyde Chitty, A Tribute to Caroline Benn: Education and Democracy (2004), collecting various papers relevant to the campaign for comprehensive education, an issue on which her mother had been a prominent campaigner. In recent years, Benn has become an advocate for comprehensives and a critic of many aspects of government policy on education. In 2006, with Fiona Millar, she wrote a pamphlet entitled A Comprehensive Future: Quality and Equality for All our Children, which was launched at the House of Commons in January 2006 at a meeting addressed by the former leader of the Labour Party Neil Kinnock and a former Secretary of State for Education Estelle Morris.

Her second novel, One of Us, a story of two families set against the backdrop of the Iraq War, was published in 2008.

Benn helped form the Local Schools Network in 2010, a pro-state schools pressure group. School Wars (2011) studies the UK's post-war comprehensive education system. What Should We Tell Our Daughters? was published in 2013.

In 2012, Benn won the Fred and Anne Jarvis Award, presented by the National Union of Teachers for her campaigning and work for the cause of comprehensive education.

Personal life
Melissa Benn lives in London with her husband Paul Gordon and their two daughters. In accordance with her support for the state education system, her children attended state schools. She is the daughter of politician Tony Benn and writer-educationalist Caroline Benn.

Selected publications
Sexual Harassment at Work (NCCL pamphlet; 1982)
The Rape Controversy, with Tess Gill and Anna Coote (NCCL pamphlet; second and third editions only, 1983, 1986)
Death in the City, with Ken Worpole (non-fiction; Canary Press, 1985)
Courts and Sentencing (Children's Legal Centre pamphlet; 1987)
Public Lives (novel; 1995)
Madonna and Child: Politics of Modern Motherhood (non-fiction; Vintage, 1998)
A tribute to Caroline Benn: education and democracy (non-fiction; Continuum, 2004)
A Comprehensive Future: Quality and Equality for all our Children (non-fiction; Compass, 2006)
One of Us (novel; Chatto and Windus, 2008)
School Wars: The Battle for Britain's Education (non-fiction; Verso, 2011)
What should we tell our daughters?: The pleasures and pressures of growing up female (non-fiction; John Murray, 2013)

References

1957 births
20th-century English women writers
20th-century English writers
21st-century English novelists
21st-century English women writers
Academics of the Open University
Alumni of the London School of Economics
Comprehensive education
Daughters of viscounts
English journalists
English people of American descent
English people of Scottish descent
English women non-fiction writers
Living people
People educated at Holland Park School
People from Hammersmith
Melissa